Mir Taj Muhammad Jamali was a Pakistani politician and the former Balochistan chief minister and a veteran politician.

In April 2006, Taj Jamali offered to arrange a meeting between President Pervez Musharraf and a Loya Jirga (grand jirga) for peace in Balochistan.

Jamali died in Karachi on 2 April 2009; he had been under a doctor's care for heart problems.  He was interred in his ancestral town of Rojhan Jamali in the district of Jaffarabad, Pakistan.

References

 

Chief Ministers of Balochistan, Pakistan
Taj Muhammad
2009 deaths
Forman Christian College alumni
Baloch people
Year of birth missing
Balochistan MPAs 1990–1993